Segonzac is a commune  within the Charente department of southwestern France, in the Cognac area. It is the heart of the "Grande Champagne" grape-cultivating region of the cognaçais, which produces the finest cognac and Pineau des Charentes. There's also a large church and local fitness facilities such as a public swimming-pool, a track and a football pitch. The Château de Saint-Martial is situated nearby.

Population

See also
Communes of the Charente department

References

Communes of Charente
Charente communes articles needing translation from French Wikipedia